Poueyferré is a commune in the Hautes-Pyrénées department in south-western France. Located about thirteen kilometres north of Argelès-Gazost, in 2016 it had a population of 856, reducing to 843 at the 2019 Census.

See also
Communes of the Hautes-Pyrénées department

References

Communes of Hautes-Pyrénées